Housseras is a commune in the Vosges department in Grand Est in northeastern France.

Points of interest
Jardin botanique de Gondremer
Grave of Wolfgang Döblin (mathematician), and his parents Erna and Alfred Döblin (writer)

See also
Communes of the Vosges department

References

Communes of Vosges (department)